Eugène Cantiran de Boirie, real name Jean-Bernard-Eugène Cantiran de Boirie, (22 October 1785 – 14 December 1837) was a French dramatist.

Boirie was the son of a chief clerk of the stewardship of Paris, which at the time of the Revolution, spent the remainder of his fortune to the acquisition of the Théâtre des Jeunes-Artistes. His son, whose education was neglected but was gifted with a brilliant imagination, felt the vocation for drama, and at age 20 had his first play performed. Unable to write these tragedies he conceived well and combined with a perfect understanding of the scene, he could not do without employees. Among the seventeen authors who were kind enough to work with him, several spirited men achieved many successes in the world of theater.

After his father died, Boirie became owner of the Théâtre des jeunes Artistes, but was stripped of his ownership by the imperial decree that abolished many theaters. He then was the dramaturge for four years of the théâtre de l’Impératrice, a position he lost at the time of the First Restoration, which did not prevent him from being a zealous royalist.

In 1822, he became dramaturge of the théâtre de la Porte-Saint-Martin, but Jean-Toussaint Merle, who had called him to this place, left the management of the theater. Attacked with terrible diseases as a result from the abuse of pleasures, Boirie lived since then in retirement before dying, after great suffering, in a nursing home located in the quartier Saint-Marcel of Paris.

Theatre 
 Storb et Verner, ou Les Suites d'un duel (with P.-J.-A. Bonel), drama in 3 acts, théâtre de la Porte-Saint-Martin, 6 April 1815 : La Marquise de Gange, ou Les Trois Frères (with Léopold Chandezon), melodrama in 3 acts and in prose, inspired by the Causes Célèbres, théâtre de la Gaité, 18 November 1815
 Jean sans peur, duc de Bourgogne, ou le Pont de Montereau (with Léopold Chandezon), melodrama in 3 acts and in prose, théâtre de la Porte-Saint-Martin, December 1815
 Le Banc de sable, ou les Naufragés français (with Frédéric Dupetit-Méré and Jean-Toussaint Merle), melodrama in 3 acts in prose, théâtre de la Porte-Saint-Martin, 14 April 1819
 Chacun son numéro, ou le Petit Homme gris, comédie en vaudevilles in 1 act (with Pierre Carmouche, Théodore Baudouin d'Aubigny), théâtre de la Porte-Saint-Martin, 6 December 1821
 Le Château de Kenilworth (with Henri Lemaire), 3-acts melodrama after Walter Scott, théâtre de la Porte-Saint-Martin, 23 March 1822
 Les Deux Forçats, ou la Meunière du Puy-de-Dôme (with Carmouche and Alphonse André Véran), melodrama in 3 acts, théâtre de la Porte-Saint-Martin, 3 October 1822
 Les Invalides ou Cent ans de gloire, tableau militaire in 2 acts (with Jean-Toussaint Merle, Henri Simon and Ferdinand Laloue) to celebrate the return of H.R.H. the duke of Angoulême, music by Louis Alexandre Piccinni, théâtre de la Porte-Saint-Martin, 15 December 1823
 Le Commissionnaire (with Ferdinand Laloue and Constant Ménissier), melodrama in 3 acts, théâtre de la Porte-Saint-Martin, 10 June 1824
 L'Oncle et le neveu, ou les Noms supposés (with Pierre Tournemine), comédie en vaudevilles in 1 act, théâtre de la Porte-Saint-Martin, 14 February 1826

Sources 
Biographie universelle, ancienne et moderne : revue bibliographique universelle, t. 4, Paris, Madame C. Desplaces, 1854, 700 p.  read on line

 

19th-century French dramatists and playwrights
French theatre managers and producers
Dramaturges
Writers from Paris
1785 births
1837 deaths